Rašid Šemsedinović (11 January 1941 – 14 November 2021) was a Serbian ice hockey player. He competed in the men's tournament at the 1964 Winter Olympics.

He died in Belgrade on 14 November 2021, at the age of 80.

References

External links
 

1941 births
2021 deaths
Ice hockey players at the 1964 Winter Olympics
Olympic ice hockey players of Yugoslavia
Sportspeople from Belgrade
HK Partizan players